The Lobethal Circuit was a motor racing course centred on the South Australian town of Lobethal in the Mount Lofty Ranges, 22 miles from the state capital, Adelaide. It was utilized for four race meetings from 1937 to 1948, hosting a number of major races including the 1939 Australian Grand Prix. Today the roads of the circuit make up a part of the Tour Down Under international bicycle race.

Layout
Roughly triangular in shape, the circuit comprised temporarily closed public roads which passed through the towns of Charleston and Lobethal. Two of the four approach roads to Lobethal were utilised as was the main road through Charleston, each of these having sealed surfaces. It is the longest circuit to have been used in Australian motor racing, and the average speed for the 1939 Australian Grand Prix was the fastest of any Australian Grand Prix prior to 1956, with race winner Tomlinson averaging 84.00 mph.

History

The circuit was first used for a combined motorcycle and car race meeting held 27 December 1937 through 3 January 1938. Similar meetings were held in 1938/39 and 1939/40, with the former featuring the 1939 Australian Grand Prix for cars. A fourth meeting, again a combined affair, was held on 1 January 1948. The 1948 meeting would be the last to be held at Lobethal, with attempts by the organizing group to re-establish racing at the circuit thwarted in 1951 by the introduction of South Australian Government legislation prohibiting the use of public roads for racing.

Major races

The following table lists the feature motorcycle race and the feature car race at each of the four race meetings staged at the Lobethal Circuit.

References

External links
 Racing History Of Lobethal - 2008 Documentary, vimeo.com

Motorsport venues in South Australia
Australian Grand Prix
Motorsport at Lobethal